An official system of weights and measures was established in the ancient 
Persian Empire under the Achaemenid dynasty (550-350 BCE). The shekel and mina ("profane" or "sacred") were units of both weight and volume. A shekel or mina weight was equal to the weight of that volume of water. The talent was a measure of weight used for large amounts of coinage. Some related units were used in Persia in the 19th century, and are still used in contemporary Iran.

Ancient Persian units

Length

Volume
The shekel and mina ("profane" or "sacred") were units of both weight and volume. A shekel or mina weight was equal to the weight of that volume of water. Note that the values given for the mina do not match the definitions.

 1 shekel = 8.3 ml (approximately 1 cubic aiwas).
 1 profane mina = 50 shekel = 500 ml (approximately 27 cubic aiwas).
 1 sacred mina = 60 shekel = 600 ml (approximately 1 cubic dva).
 1 talent (volume) = 60 profane mina = 25 liters (approximately 1  cubic trayas).

Weight
The talent was a measure of weight used for large amounts of coinage (bullion, bulk coin), rather than an individual coin. Seven Babylonian talents equalled ten Attic talents, according to a list of the revenues of Cyrus the Great (Cyrus II of Persia) recorded in Herodotus.

Units used in modern Persia (Iran)

Some related units were used in Persia in the 19th century, and are still used in contemporary Iran.

Length
 1 arsani or ulna = 52-64 cm.
 1 arish = 
 1 chebel = 40 arsani = 21-25 meters or 23-30 yards.
 1 farsang (parasang) = 6.23 km in 19th century Persia.
 1 farsang = 10 kilometers in modern Iran and Turkey.

Volume
 1 chenica = 1.32 liters.

References

Obsolete units of measurement
Human-based units of measurement
Systems of units
Units of measurement by country